Ejector may refer to:

 Caterpillar 740 Ejector, an articulated hauler (dump truck)
 Hand ejector, a specific revolver (handgun) design
 Ejection seat, an escape device for aircraft
 Ejectment, a law term concerning recovering the possession of or title to land
 Ejector or injector, a pump-like device without moving parts (Static mechanical equipment)
 Ejector (firearms), an action component in firearms that pushes used cartridge casing out of the gun after firing
 Ejector rack, an aircraft fitting for carrying bombs
 Ejector (Transformers), a character from the Transformers franchise
 Ejector venturi scrubber, an industrial pollution control device
 Giesl ejector, a suction draught system for steam locomotives
 Kylpor ejector, a steam locomotive exhaust system
 Lempor ejector, a steam locomotive exhaust system
 Lemprex ejector, a steam locomotive exhaust system
 Steam ejector, a railway locomotive component used to create vacuum
 Vacuum ejector, a type of vacuum pump which uses the venturi effect.

See also
 Ejection (disambiguation)
 Injector (disambiguation)